Epiaeschna heros, the swamp darner, is a species of darner in the dragonfly family Aeshnidae. It is found in the Caribbean Sea and North America.

The IUCN conservation status of Epiaeschna heros is "LC", least concern, with no immediate threat to the species' survival. The population is stable. The IUCN status was reviewed in 2017.

References

External links

 

Aeshnidae
Insects described in 1798